Why I'm Not... with Brant Pinvidic is a podcast about topics, fads, trends, and addictions from an outsider's perspective, often featuring celebrity interviews and discussions, hosted by Brant Pinvidic. The show was launched by PodcastOne in April 2017 in Los Angeles, California, and AfterBuzz TV began providing for the broadcast later that year. The episodes typically range from 40 to 90 minutes in length, and include discussions with celebrities and experts. Notable guests have included Ben Shapiro, and Jason Ellis, Spencer Pratt.

The show's premise is derived from the concept of Pinvidic's films Why I'm Not on Facebook and Why I'm Not on Pokemon GO, both of which also explored cultural phenomenons, specifically those of Facebook and Pokémon Go respectively, and featured interviews with both everyday people and celebrity guests and experts. In 2017, Pinvidic spoke at the National Association of Broadcasters Media Finance and Investor Conference in Las Vegas where he was interviewed by Larry King, along with Jon Taffer and Rick Harrison, in a session called Celebrity Executive Officers: How These CEOS Manage Reality.

Episodes 

Guests vary by profession and topic but typically relate to modern fads, trends, addictions, or popular controversial issues. The show is light-hearted in tone and encourages listeners to try to understand the topics before judging them. Roxy Striar co-hosts the first season and Trisha Hershberger hosts the second season.

It was announced that the podcast is being developed as a television series by INvelop Entertainment and STX Entertainment.

On January 5, 2018, Hope Solo was featured on the podcast. The episode was aired prior to Solo announcing her candidacy for President of the United States Soccer Federation. During the episode, she called out sexism within the football world, specifically citing Sunil Gulati, Dan Flynn and the USSF board of directors for threatening fewer games in retaliation for the team requesting higher pay. Solo also criticized the sexist imbalance of recognition for female athletes, notably between Alex Morgan and Carli Lloyd, saying:And people don’t even know [Carli’s] name. You know who they know? Alex Morgan. Alex Morgan hasn’t scored as many goals as Carli, as many impactful goals. Hasn’t ever really shown up the way Carli has in major, major, major tournaments. And you wonder - Carli has done everything for the game. She’s passionate, she’s a competitive athlete, she’s a leader, but people don’t give her that respect. And why? Because she doesn’t wear makeup on the field, because she doesn’t get false eyelashes, because she doesn’t have a boob job, because she doesn’t do photo shoots naked. Honestly, that’s what she has to balance with competing for endorsements with her teammates.

Season 1 (2017-2018)

Reception 
The podcast has been praised by The Guardian and iNews, who named the show as Podcast of the Week and recommended the show as "perfect for keeping ahead of the curve."

In January 2018, the show ranked #7 on the iTunes Society and Culture podcast charts and #34 on the iTunes overall podcast charts.

References

External links 
 

2017 podcast debuts
2019 podcast endings
Audio podcasts
Comedy and humor podcasts
American podcasts